Amish Devgan (born 1 March 1980), is an Indian news anchor, who is the managing editor of News18 India. He is well known for his debate show "Aar Paar". Before News18 India, Devgan was the editor and a news anchor of Zee Media from 2014 to 2015. Previously, he had also served stints at Hindustan Times.

Awards and honours 
 The IMF's Young Emerging Editors Award in 2015.

Controversies and criticism 
Devgan has been the subject of controversy for sharing misinformation regarding the Muslim community.

Kurla Masjid 
There have been many FIRs against Devgan, one of the complaint was registered on 1 May 2020 over his false claims of Muslims offering of namaz in Kurla masjid, Devgan also showed a fake video claiming the gathering of people near Kurla Masjid.

Defamation of Sufi Saint Khwaja Moinuddin Chishti 
Other complaints were filed against him for defaming Sufi Saint Khwaja Moinuddin Chisti (commonly known as Hazrat Khwaja Ghareeb Nawaz) on 15 June 2020 by saying Lootera (Robber) Chisti, however Devgan after this on 17 June apologized and clarified that he wanted to refer to Khilji (Alauddin Khilji) as a marauder, mentioned the name 'Chisti'. Supreme Court of India rejected the plea of Devgan to quash all the FIR against him.

Fake poster 
A fake poster of his show also went viral on Twitter claiming Modi was instrumental for death of Baghdadi, after which Devgan responded and clarified that the poster was fake.

Abuse on national television 
Rajiv Tyagi insulted Amish Devgan on live debate at News 18 India after which Amish faced many hate comments on his social media posts.

References

External links 

Living people
1984 births
Indian activist journalists
21st-century Indian journalists
Indian television news anchors
Indian male television journalists
Indian political journalists
Indian television talk show hosts
Indian journalists
Managing editors